is a 1988 short experimental film by Japanese underground filmmaker Shozin Fukui. Fukui made the film at around the same time as when he was working as a crew member for Shinya Tsukamoto's Tetsuo: The Iron Man. Both films utilize similar filmmaking techniques such as hyperactive, handheld camerawork and stop-motion photography.

Release
Caterpillar was included as a bonus feature for the Unearthed Films DVD release of Fukui's first feature film 964 Pinocchio in 2007. The DVD has since been discontinued.

References

1988 films
1980s Japanese-language films
Films directed by Shozin Fukui
1980s Japanese films
1980s avant-garde and experimental films
Japanese avant-garde and experimental films